Troy Township is located in Will County, Illinois. As of the 2010 census, its population was 45,991 and it contained 17,522 housing units. It contains the western edge of the city of Joliet and the entirety of the village of Shorewood.

Geography

Demographics

References

External links
City-data.com
Will County Official Site
Illinois State Archives

Townships in Will County, Illinois
Townships in Illinois
1849 establishments in Illinois